

The net international investment position (NIIP) is the difference in the external financial assets and liabilities of a country. External debt of a country includes government debt and private debt. External assets publicly and privately held by a country's legal residents are also taken into account when calculating NIIP. Commodities and currencies tend to follow a cyclical pattern of significant valuation changes, which is also reflected in NIIP.

The International investment position (IIP) of a country is a financial statement of the value and composition of its external financial assets and liabilities. A positive NIIP value indicates that a nation is a creditor nation, while a negative value indicates that it is a debtor nation.

History
The US was the world's largest creditor until the 1960s. However, over the last few decades, the US has become the world's largest debtor. Since the 1980s, Japan replaced the US as the world's largest creditor nation. With the ascent of the Hong Kong Monetary Authority's credit position since 2015, China (including Hong Kong and Macau), Germany and Japan have been competing for the top creditor position.

List of countries and regions by net international investment position (NIIP)

See also 
Net foreign assets
List of countries by external debt
List of countries by public debt
List of countries by net international investment position per capita

References

External links 
Bureau of Economic Analysis Elena L. Nguyen: The International Investment Position of the United States at Yearend 2007. U.S.
 Bank of Japan Japan’s International Investment Position at Year-End 2009  (Retrieved on June 30, 2011)
 Deutsche Bundesbank (German Central Bank) International Investment Position - External Debt Statistics
European Economic Forecast Spring 2010 European Commission working draft Graph 1.3.2., International investment position since 1980 in major economic units.

Statistics 
 International Monetary Fund (IMF) International Investment Position (IIP) Data
 International Monetary Fund (IMF) World Economic Outlook Database, April 2011
 UK National Statistics Great Britain: International Investment Position, Table K
 Saint-Petersburg (Russia) statistic Economic statistics of St. Petersburg

International macroeconomics
International factor movements
National accounts